Lawrence J. Dolan (born February 8, 1931) is an American retired attorney and the principal owner of the Cleveland Guardians of Major League Baseball (MLB).

Education
Dolan attended St. Ignatius High School and got his law degree from University of Notre Dame in 1956.  He also received an honorary Doctor of Laws degree from Cleveland State University.

Professional career
Upon leaving Notre Dame, Dolan served in the United States Marine Corps for two years, where he attained the rank of first lieutenant. Upon leaving the Marine Corps in 1958, Dolan worked as assistant prosecutor in Geauga County, Ohio before going into private practice. He eventually became president and managing partner of Thrasher, Dinsmore, & Dolan in Chardon, Ohio.

Cleveland Guardians owner
In 2000, Dolan (through a family trust) bought the Cleveland Indians of Major League Baseball (MLB) for $323 million from Richard Jacobs, who, along with his late brother David Jacobs, had paid $35 million for the club in 1986. Jacobs had taken the team public in 1997.  As part of the deal, Dolan bought all of the stock at just over $12 a share, making the franchise privately held once again. During his time as owner, the team has experienced periods of competitiveness, including playoff runs in 2007, 2013, and making it to the World Series in 2016, as well as periods without success, including several seasons with over 90 losses.

While the team's player salaries were among the highest in MLB during Jacobs' final years as owner, at times they have been among the lowest under Dolan. This has led some fans to regard Dolan as miserly, although other fans dispute the reputation. After the team reached the 2016 World Series, the team acquired free agents Edwin Encarnación and Boone Logan. However, both of these players were with other teams by 2019 in an attempt to reduce payroll, thus adding to both sides of the “miserly” argument between fans.

In 2006, Dolan started SportsTime Ohio to broadcast the team's games; in 2012, it was sold to Fox Entertainment Group.

In November 2021, the baseball team officially changed its name to the Cleveland Guardians.

Personal life
Dolan has six children; among them are Matt who is a State Senator, and Paul who worked for his law firm and was since named as president, and later Chairman, CEO, and controlling owner of the baseball team. Dolan has said his children will eventually assume ownership of the team in his stead.

Dolan's nephew James L. Dolan owns the New York Knicks of the NBA and the New York Rangers of the NHL.

Dolan has three brothers: Charles; Bill (retired in Fort Myers, Florida, at the time of his death in 2013) and David (died in a glider plane crash in 1980).

Awards and honors
Personal
Greater Cleveland Sports Hall of Fame inductee (class of 2014)
Team
 American League champion (2016)
 6× American League Central division champion (2001, 2007, 2016, 2017, 2018, 2022)

References 

1931 births
Major League Baseball executives
Major League Baseball team presidents
Cablevision
Cleveland Indians owners
Cleveland Indians executives
Dolan family
Living people
Businesspeople from Cleveland
Notre Dame Law School alumni
Saint Ignatius High School (Cleveland) alumni
United States Marine Corps officers
Lawyers from Cleveland
People from Cleveland Heights, Ohio
People from Geauga County, Ohio